King Brothers [キング・ブラザーズ] is a rock band from Nishinomiya City in Hyogo Prefecture, Japan. Formed in 1997, the band made its major label debut on Toshiba EMI in 2001. The group was banned from performing at several venues in Osaka after destructive live shows.

Personnel

Current members 
Keizo (Vocals, Guitar)
Marya (Guitar, Screaming)
Shinnosuke (Bass)
Taichi (Drums, Power)

Former members 
Kitauchi (Guitar)
Jun (Drums)
Kawasaki (Drums)
Linda (Drums)

Discography

Albums 
King Brothers (1998) (known as the Bulb Edition)
★★★★★★★ (1999) (known as the Star Edition)
キングブラザーズ (25 February 2001）(known as the Red Edition)
King Brothers (23 May 2001) (known as the Rainbow Edition)
6×3 (2002) (EP produced by Jon Spencer)
13 (2003)
Blues (2004)

Video/DVD 
American Tour '99
Live at Cafe Blue (2004)

Tours 
King Brothers Conquest of Japan Tour (2000)
King Brothers Tour 2003
Japan Insanity - Charming Deep-Sea Party (2004)
Lesson 1, The Devil's Violent Classroom (Tear Out Page 2004 of the Dangerous Beat Course) (2004)
One Hundred Ways to Victimize You, The King (2005)
The Devil's Time Travel - Chase the Evil Brothers Flying Through Time!! (2005)
New Zealand Tour With The DHDFD's 2007
2008 Japan "Tour of Hells Across Japan" The DHDFD's Vs The King Brothers and Watusi Zombie

References

External links
Official Site (Japanese)
Profile at JMusicEuropa
Annotated discography at Rock of Japan

Japanese rock music groups
1997 establishments in Japan
Musical groups established in 1997
Musical groups from Hyōgo Prefecture